Cerevajka is a village located in the municipality of Preševo, Serbia. According to the 2002 census, the village has a population of 70 people. Of these, 67 (95,71 %) were ethnic Albanians, and 3 (4,28 %) were Muslims.

References

Populated places in Pčinja District
Albanian communities in Serbia
Preševo